Carbon suboxide, or tricarbon dioxide, is an organic, oxygen-containing chemical compound with formula  and structure . Its four cumulative double bonds make it a cumulene. It is one of the stable members of the series of linear oxocarbons , which also includes carbon dioxide and pentacarbon dioxide. Although if carefully purified it can exist at room temperature in the dark without decomposing, it will polymerize under certain conditions.

The substance was discovered in 1873 by Benjamin Brodie by subjecting carbon monoxide to an electric current. In 1891 Marcellin Berthelot observed that heating pure carbon monoxide at about 550 °C created small amounts of carbon dioxide but no trace of carbon, and assumed that a carbon-rich oxide was created instead, which he named "sub-oxide". He assumed it was the same product obtained by electric discharge and proposed the formula . Otto Diels later stated that the more organic names dicarbonylmethane and dioxallene were also correct.

It is commonly described as an oily liquid or gas at room temperature with an extremely noxious odor.

Synthesis
It is synthesized by warming a dry mixture of phosphorus pentoxide and malonic acid or its esters.
Therefore, it can be also considered as the anhydride of malonic anhydride, i.e. the "second anhydride" of malonic acid.

Several other ways for synthesis and reactions of carbon suboxide can be found in a review from 1930 by Reyerson.

Polymerization
Carbon suboxide polymerizes spontaneously to a red, yellow, or black solid. The structure is postulated to be poly(α-pyronic), similar to the structure in 2-pyrone (α-pyrone). The number of monomers in the polymers is variable (see Oxocarbon#Polymeric carbon oxides).
In 1969, it was hypothesized that the color of the Martian surface was caused by this compound; this was disproved by the Viking Mars probes (the red color is instead due to iron oxide).

Uses
Carbon suboxide is used in the preparation of malonates; and as an auxiliary to improve the dye affinity of furs.

Biological role 

Carbon suboxide, C3O2, can be produced in small amounts in any biochemical process that normally produces carbon monoxide, CO, for example, during heme oxidation by heme oxygenase-1. It can also be formed from malonic acid. It has been shown that carbon suboxide in an organism can quickly polymerize into macrocyclic polycarbon structures with the common formulan (mostly  and ), and that those macrocyclic compounds are potent inhibitors of Na+/K+-ATP-ase and Ca-dependent ATP-ase, and have digoxin-like physiological properties and natriuretic and antihypertensive actions. Those macrocyclic carbon suboxide polymer compounds are thought to be endogenous digoxin-like regulators of Na+/K+-ATP-ases and Ca-dependent ATP-ases, and endogenous natriuretics and antihypertensives. Other than that, some authors think also that those macrocyclic compounds of carbon suboxide can possibly diminish free radical formation and oxidative stress and play a role in endogenous anticancer protective mechanisms, for example in the retina.

Structure and bonding 
The structure of carbon suboxide has been the subject of experiments and computations since the 1970s. The central issue is the question of whether the molecule is linear or bent (i.e., whether \theta_{C2} = \angle C1C2C3 \ \overset{?}{=}\ 180\!^\circ). Studies generally agree that the molecule is highly non-rigid, with a very shallow barrier to bending. According to one study, the molecular geometry is described by a double-well potential with a minimum at θC2 ~ 160°, an inversion barrier of 20 cm−1 (0.057 kcal/mol), and a total energy change of 80 cm−1 (0.23 kcal/mol) for 140° ≤ θC2 ≤ 180°. The small energetic barrier to bending is around the same order of magnitude as the vibrational zero-point energy.  Therefore, the molecule is best described as quasilinear. While infrared and electron diffraction studies have indicated that  has a bent structure in the gas phase, the compound was found to possess at least an average linear geometry in the solid phase by X-ray crystallography, although the large thermal ellipsoids of the oxygen atoms and C2 have been interpreted to be consistent with rapid bending (minimum θC2 ~ 170°), even in the solid state.

A heterocumulene resonance form of carbon suboxide based on minimization of formal charges does not readily explain the molecule's non-rigidity and deviation from linearity. To account for the quasilinear structure of carbon suboxide, Frenking has proposed that carbon suboxide be regarded as a "coordination complex" of carbon(0) bearing two carbonyl ligands and two lone pairs: OC:->\overset{..}{\underset{..}{C}}<-:CO.

References

External links
WebElements page on compound's properties

Oxocarbons
Gaseous signaling molecules
Heterocumulenes
Enones
Ketenes
Diketones
Foul-smelling chemicals